René Le Roy (4 March 1898 – 3 January 1985) sometimes spelled René LeRoy, was a French 20th-century flutist and a pedagogue.

Biography 
René Le Roy was born in 1898 in Maisons-Laffitte. His parents were both amateur musicians, his father playing the flute and his mother the piano. It was his father who began his education as early as 1906. In 1916, he studied with Adolphe Hennebains, Léopold Lafleurance and Philippe Gaubert at the Conservatoire de Paris, where he graduated in 1918.

In 1922, he established the Quintette instrumental de Paris with flute, harp and string trio. Several composers wrote for the ensemble, including Albert Roussel (Sérénade pour flûte, harpe, violon, alto et violoncelle opus 30), Vincent d'Indy (suite, opus 91), Joseph Jongen and Cyril Scott.

From 1952 to 1968, René Le Roy was a solo flute at the New York City Opera Orchestra, and until 1971 he was a chamber music teacher at the Conservatoire de Paris. Among his students were Christine Alicot, Juho Alvas, Thomas Brown, Susan Morris DeJong, Geoffrey Gilbert and Bassam Saba.

Publication 
Traité de la flûte, historique, technique et pédagogique. (with Claude Dorgeuille), Paris, Éditions musicales transatlantiques, 1966. 103 p.

References

External links 
 René Le Roy :  La flûte française
 Discography of René Le Roy on Discogs
  ¿Quién fue René Le Roy?
 
  Biographie on flutepage.de
  Brève bibliographie on robertbigio.com
 Honegger - Danse de la Chevre - Rene Le Roy (flute) on YouTube 

Conservatoire de Paris alumni
Academic staff of the Conservatoire de Paris
French classical flautists
People from Maisons-Laffitte
1898 births
1985 deaths
20th-century classical musicians
20th-century flautists